Universal Destinations & Experiences (formerly Universal Parks & Resorts), also known as Universal Studios Theme Parks or solely Universal Theme Parks, is the theme park unit of NBCUniversal, a subsidiary of Comcast. The company, headquartered in Orlando, Florida, operates Universal theme parks and resort properties around the world. Universal Parks & Resorts is best known for attractions and lands based on famous classic and modern pop culture properties (movies, television, literature, cartoons, comics, video games, music, etc.) from not only NBCUniversal, but also third-party companies, for all of its parks.

It started as a touring attraction in the 1910s at the Universal Studios Lot in Universal City near Los Angeles, California, and in 1964 turned into a Universal Studios Hollywood theme park destination, where guests can look behind the scenes of motion pictures and television programs, produced by Universal Pictures and occasionally others, and ride the attraction based on the world's favorite feature films and television shows. The popularity of Universal Studios Hollywood had led Universal to build parks in Florida and overseas.

In 2017, approximately 49,458,000 guests visited Universal Studios theme parks, making it the third-largest amusement park operator in the world. It is a major competitor of Cedar Fair, Disney Parks, Experiences and Products, Six Flags, SeaWorld Parks & Entertainment, Herschend Family Entertainment, Parques Reunidos/Palace Entertainment, and Merlin Entertainments. In August 2020, a report released by Deutsche Bank revealed that Universal Orlando had surpassed Walt Disney World in total attendance in the first months after both resorts reopened during the global COVID-19 pandemic. This came after Universal reopened its parks in June 2020 and Walt Disney World reopened in July 2020 with capacity modifications, according to the report.

On March 8, 2023, Universal Parks and Resorts CEO Mark Woodbury announced that they would be rebranding the division to "Universal Destinations and Experiences". Woodbury stated "Universal Destinations & Experiences aligns with our aspiration to be the Destination of Choice in the markets where we are today and the markets we enter in the future. We are thrilled to expand how we bring the Universal brand to life in new, immersive and compelling ways for fans around the world using our rich collection of stories, characters and franchises."

Steven Spielberg's relationship with Universal Destinations & Experiences
Director Steven Spielberg has a long-time collaboration with Universal Destinations & Experiences due to his relationship with Universal Studios while working as a Universal intern staff in the late 1960s as well as the films he directed or produced for the studio, such as Jaws, E.T. the Extra-Terrestrial, Back to the Future, The Land Before Time, Jurassic Park and Schindler's List. In March 1987, Spielberg signed on to be a creative consultant for Universal theme parks when the Music Corporation of America (MCA)—then owner of Universal Studios—was planning to build its first full-fledged theme park in Orlando in an effort to compete with Walt Disney World. Universal Parks Chairman and CEO Thomas L. Williams stated in regards to praising the Universal Creative team and a few popular people for the new Florida park:

Since 1987, Spielberg has consulted on a dozen attractions, included E.T. Adventure, Jaws, Jurassic Park: The Ride, and The Amazing Adventures of Spider-Man. In exchange, he receives 2% of all park ticket revenue and a portion of park concession receipts generated by Universal theme parks in Florida, Japan, and Singapore in perpetuity, valued at up to $30 to 50 million a year; the Universal Studios Hollywood theme park in Los Angeles is not covered under the Spielberg deal. The director also got the opportunity to trigger a June 2017 exit deal clause and collect a lump sum payment equal to the value of the contracts. Comcast, the current parent company of Universal, acknowledged that this payment could already be worth as much as $535 million. Some analysts predicted that the one-time payment could ultimately be $1 billion. The deal also prevents any film Spielberg worked as a director to go to any rival theme park but Universal; the exception is the Indiana Jones movies, which Spielberg directed, but with the story entirely created, written, and held by his long-time friend George Lucas, who regularly worked with Walt Disney Parks, Experiences and Consumer Products as their creative consultant for attractions like Star Tours, Captain EO, Indiana Jones Adventure, and ExtraTERRORestrial Alien Encounter.

Current theme parks

Universal Studios Hollywood

Universal Studios Hollywood became the first Universal Studios theme park when it opened its doors on July 15, 1964, long after it was originated as a studio tour in 1915, after the Universal original founder, Carl Laemmle, opened Universal City, California near Los Angeles. In May 1993, Universal CityWalk opened outside the gates of the theme park, featuring 65 entertainment-themed restaurants, nightclubs, shops, and entertainment spots. It also contains Universal Cinema operated by AMC Theatres, offering 19 screens including an IMAX Theatre and stadium-style seating. Approximately 415 acres (1.7 km2) is within and around the surrounding area of Universal City, including its theme park and the film studio adjacent nearby.

Universal Orlando Resort

Universal Orlando Resort (formerly called Universal Studios Escape) opened to the public on June 7, 1990, in Orlando, Florida, starting at Universal Studios Florida. It features themed areas and attractions based on the film industry.

On May 28, 1999, Universal Orlando had expanded into a family vacation resort, with the opening of Universal's Islands of Adventure theme park, featuring various themed islands which emphasized adventures and characters embodied in the attractions. Simultaneously, Universal CityWalk was added to accommodate the guests within the resort leading to the two parks. Loews Portofino Bay Hotel at Universal Orlando hotel opened at Universal Orlando Resort in September 1999, followed by Hard Rock Hotel in December 2000, Loews Royal Pacific Resort in February 2001, Cabana Bay Beach Resort on March 31, 2014, Loews Sapphire Falls Resort on July 7, 2016, and Universal's Aventura Hotel on August 16, 2018.

In 1998, Universal Orlando acquired Wet 'n Wild water park (founded in 1977 by Seaworld founder George Millay) and was the company's main water park until it closed on December 31, 2016, where it was replaced by another water park Volcano Bay, which opened on May 25, 2017. The new water park consists of 18 attractions, including slides, two lazy rivers and raft rides. It is also Universal's first park to be not be based on various famous properties. The park includes two volcano themed rides: the Ko'okiri Body Plunge, a 70-degree-angle, 125-foot water slide; and the Krakatau Aqua Coaster, a canoe ride traveling among the peaks and valleys of the central volcano in the park. The park also gives each visitor a wristband when they buy their ticket. The wristband allows guests to check in for rides and circumvents having to stand in line. In August 2019, Universal announced its third theme park called "Epic Universe", which is to include lands and attractions based on Nintendo, Universal Monsters, and DreamWorks Animation, among others, and is scheduled to open in Summer 2025.

Universal Studios Japan

After almost three years of construction, Universal Studios Japan opened on March 31, 2001, in the Konohana-ku district of Osaka, Japan, and was the first Universal Studios theme park to open outside of the U.S. It was also the first Universal theme park to operate within the Asian region. The park incorporates attractions from both Universal Orlando and Hollywood and features a CityWalk district, a shopping mall with multiple official Universal hotels and many restaurants and shops, including stores selling Universal Studios merchandise and Osaka souvenirs. The theme park occupies an area of 108 acres and is the second-most visited amusement park in Japan after its rival Tokyo Disney Resort.

Universal Studios Singapore

Construction of the Singapore park began within Resorts World Sentosa on Sentosa, Singapore on April 19, 2008. Universal Studios Singapore was given a soft opening on March 18, 2010 and later a wide opening on May 28, 2011. It was the second Universal Studios theme park to operate on Asia and also the first in Southeast Asia. Like other Universal theme parks, it features attractions from various Universal and other studio companies' properties, including Jurassic Park, Madagascar, Shrek, The Mummy, Waterworld, Transformers, and others. The land it currently sits on is 20 hectares (49 acres) in size, which occupies the easternmost part of the 49-hectare (120-acre) Resorts World Sentosa, and is marketed as a "one-of-its-kind theme park in Asia". However, it has no Universal CityWalk District since it already has a resort shopping mall and restaurants adjacent near the park. Unlike other Universal theme parks, Universal Studios Singapore is owned by Genting Group with the licensing approval from Universal Parks & Resorts.

Universal Beijing Resort

Universal Beijing Resort is the Universal resort that opened on September 20, 2021, in Beijing, China. It features rides and attractions themed primarily to Universal-owned movies, TV shows, animation, and music, and as well as licensed properties from other companies (e.g. Warner Bros., etc.). The project was announced on October 13, 2014, with more than 20 billion RMB being invested into the project. It is jointly owned by Beijing Shouhuan Cultural Tourism Investment Co., Ltd. (BSH Investment), a consortium of four state-owned companies, and Universal Parks & Resorts. Construction of Universal Studios Beijing completed in April 2021. Phase 2 of Universal Beijing Resort is planned to open in 2025.

Future theme parks and experiences

Universal's Epic Universe

Universal's Epic Universe is an upcoming theme park coming to Universal Orlando Resort in the summer of 2025. It will have a Super Nintendo World section in the park.

Unnamed theme park in Frisco, Texas
On January 11, 2023, Universal announced a "new concept"-styled theme park, geared towards families with children. The park, to be constructed in Frisco, Texas, will feature immersive themed lands and celebrate Universal's brand of entertainment, innovation, and characters.

Unnamed "horror experience" in Area15, Las Vegas
On January 11, 2023, Universal also announced a new "horror experience," which will be the anchor tenant in a new 20-acre expansion of Las Vegas' immersive Area15 entertainment district. Unlike Universal's temporary Halloween Horror Nights events, this building will be a permanent and year-round fixture. Occupying a 110,000 square-foot space, this new Universal experience is an innovative, creative complement to Area15's roots in experiential art and entertainment.

Cancelled and former parks

Cancelled
Universal Studios Europe, Melun-Sénart, Seine-et-Marne, France.

Following the establishment of Disney in Europe with the construction of Euro Disney Resort, Universal Studios Recreation Group considered construction of its own park in Europe between the late-1980's and early-1990's. The work was being considered for a site located in either Paris or London. The Rainham Marshes site in east London is abandoned, and later became the Rainham Marshes Nature Reserve. The French state was much more willing to offer tax advantages for the establishment of a park on its territory. A site in Melun-Sénart was chosen, the plans were drawn up, and the land was purchased at agricultural prices in 1971. They covered 1,300 acres of arable land in Combs-la-Ville. The theme park's construction was planned to commence in 1996, and consist of: a theme park mostly based on Universal Studios Florida, a water park, a golf course, and real estate and commercial areas. The setbacks and financial woes of Euro Disney Resort influenced the realization that this project would not succeed. The group preferred to be the buyer of an already established park, and Universal Studios bought 37% of Port Aventura's shares in June 1998.

Universal Studios, Manila, Philippines
Universal Studios Dubailand, Dubai, United Arab Emirates (Broke ground 2008, no construction since 2009)
Universal's Hollywoodland, Krefeld, Germany
Universal Studios Moscow
Universal Studios South Korea, Hwaseong, South Korea 
Universal Studios was attached to the project in South Korea since 2005 with other competitors of MGM and Paramount. After a long delay, the dealing started in 2016 to open Universal Studios Korea in 2020, but the project was canceled in 2017 due to the several disagreements in dealing. The project in Asia was later changed to Universal Beijing Resort.

Former

Universal Mediterránea, Salou, Spain (1998–2004)

Port Aventura opened in 1995. Tussauds Group had a 40.01% in the park while La Caixa had 33.19%, Anheuser-Busch had 19.9% and FECSA had 6.7%. In 1998 the majority of Tussauds Group' shares in Port Aventura (37%) were sold to Universal Parks & Resorts and the park was rebranded as 'Universal's Port Aventura' in 1999, which made it the first Universal Studios Theme Park in Europe. In 2002, two hotels and a water park (Costa Caribe) were constructed, and the resort was rebranded as 'Universal Mediterranea' the same year. In 2004, NBC Universal (Universal Studios' parent) sold all interest in PortAventura to La Caixa. It is owned and operated by La Caixa banking group's investment vehicle Criteria, but as of 2005 the Universal name has been dropped from the branding, and the resort was once again named 'PortAventura' (the space in the name is deliberately left out for trademark reasons).

Water Parks

Former
Costa Caribe Aquatic Park, Salou, Spain (2002–2004)
Wet 'n Wild Orlando (Universal Orlando Resort, Orlando, Florida, United States; wholly owned) (1977–2016)

Theme park attractions and lands

Universal Studios incorporates replicas of attractions and lands in multiple parks around the world. The pages linked above contain comprehensive lists of the attractions and lands at Universal theme parks. Most of the attractions and lands are based on Universal licenses and other licensed properties.

See also
 Universal's Halloween Horror Nights
 Incidents at Universal parks
 List of properties at Universal Parks & Resorts
 Warner Bros. Global Brands and Experiences
 Warner Bros. Studio Tour Hollywood
 Warner Bros. Studio Tour London - The Making of Harry Potter
 Warner Bros. Studios, Burbank
 Warner Bros. Studios, Leavesden
 The Wizarding World of Harry Potter (Universal Studios)
 Warner Bros. Movie World
 Warner Bros. World Abu Dhabi
 Parque Warner Madrid
 Warner Bros. Studio Tours
 Village Roadshow Theme Parks
 Warner Bros.
 Halloween Fright Nights

References

External links

Comcast
NBCUniversal
Universal Parks & Resorts
Amusement park companies